is a district of Setagaya, Tokyo, Japan.

Education
Setagaya Board of Education operates public elementary and junior high schools.

All of 1-chome and parts of 2 and 3-chome are zoned to Hachimanyama Elementary School (八幡山小学校). The remainder of 2 and 3 chome are zoned to Roka Elementary School (芦花小学校). All of 1-chome and parts of 2-chome are zoned to Midorigaoka Junior High School (緑丘中学校). All of 3-chome and parts of 2-chome are zoned to Roka Junior High School (芦花中学校).

References

Districts of Setagaya